Chaswood (formerly named Taylorville) is a rural community in the Musquodoboit Valley northwest of Middle Musquodoboit, Nova Scotia in Nova Scotia, Canada. Chaswood is named in honour of Charles Carroll Wood.

Chaswood is located in the Halifax Regional Municipality. Chaswood is situated in the Southwest Branch Musquodoboit. Other communities in this branch include, Cooks Brook, Carrolls Corner, and Dutch Settlement. Before Taylorville, Chaswood was called Charleswood, only later to be shortened to Chaswood. The first post office and general store in Chaswood were located across from the Walter Webster homestead.

Navigator

References

Explore HRM

Communities in Halifax, Nova Scotia
General Service Areas in Nova Scotia
Zachary Taylor family